A binoviewer is an optical device designed to enable binocular viewing through a single objective.

In contrast to binoculars, it allows partially stereoscopic viewing and partially monoculair viewing, this because the eyes and brain still process the image binocularly, as both images are produced by the same objective and do not differ except for aberrations induced by the binoviewer itself. 

A binoviewer consists of a beam splitter which splits the image provided by the objective into two identical (but fainter) copies, and a system of prisms or mirrors that relay the images to a pair of identical eyepieces.

Binoviewers are a standard component of laboratory microscopes and are also used with optical telescopes, particularly in amateur astronomy.

Optical devices